Swampbuster is a provision officially titled the Wetland Conservation provisions of the Food Security Act of 1985 (P.L. 99-198) that discourages the conversion of wetlands to cropland use. The purpose was a balance between attempting to reduce crop subsidies, and conserving wetlands (1985 Conference Report). 

USDA program participants, defined as "persons" in 7 CFR 12 Highly Erodible Land and Wetland Conservation (see reference to F.R.), converting a wetland not provided an exemptions in 7 CRR 12.5(b), after December 23, 1985 to make production on an annually tilled (crop) production lose eligibility for most federal farm program benefits. Wetland conversions includes drainage or removal of woody vegetation (7 CFR 12.2).  As is provided in 7 CFR 12.4, benefits are lost when wetlands are converted until they have been restored. Several types of wetlands and activities are exempt. Exceptions are provided in 7 CFR 12.5(b) and include conversions and array of actions including, but not limited to, conversions that began before December 23, 1985, conversions of wetlands that had been created artificially, crop production on wetlands that became dry through drought, and conversions that USDA has determined have minimal effect on wetland values. Swampbuster provisions (Wetland Conservation provisions) were amended in the 1990, 1996, 2002 and subsequent farm bills to provide greater flexibility for producers and landowners. The most significant amendment in the 1990 farm bill was directing that when USDA issues a wetland determination, that determination is certified by signature of USDA that the determination is accurate and sufficient.  Certified determinations remains valid by law and regulation unless the person requests a review.  USDA cannot proactively change any determination issued as certified after November 23, 1990 (date the 1990 amendments were signed into law).  In 1996, the most significant amendments to the Food Security Act of 1985 was making plain that once certified, always certified.  Also of significance is the statutory change that once determined a Prior Converted Wetland, that determination is not subject to abandonment.  Both changes were codified in the federal register in 1996 (7 CFR 12).  

Although not provided by statute, the USDA in their effort to protect wetlands, added stronger wetland protections by internal agency policy (USDA National Resources Conservation Service's National Food Security Act Manual (NFSAM)) and eventually by regulation in 1996 (7 CRR 12.2-Definitions).  These additional protections, provided by agency policy and Departmental regulation, without statutory authority, were provided to certain wetland types that provide habitat to migratory waterfowl. These wetland types are (prairie potholes, playa lakes and pocosins) and are provided special protections under what NRCS identifies as a Farmed Wetland (FW).

See also 

 Converted wetland
 Farmed wetlands

References 

7 CFR 12 - Highly Erodible Land and Wetland Conservation.  

USDA NRCS Food Security Act Manual.

Law of the United States
Wetland conservation in the United States